The Ministry of Information is a government ministry office of the Syrian Arab Republic responsible for media, press and informations.

Responsibility
Main goals of the Ministry:

 Strengthening the national feeling, social cooperation and spreading the spirit of solidarity among the people.
 Defending the issues of the Arab nation and its goals in terms of unity, freedom and socialism, and supporting the Arab national, national and progressive struggle in its various fields.
 Contribute to the dissemination of culture among the masses.
 Addressing social problems and advocating adherence to authentic Arab values.
 Reviving the Arab heritage in various literary, scientific and artistic fields.
 Informing the masses of the achievements of human civilization in various fields.
 Enlightening public opinion and informing it of the facts in the field of internal and external news, and informing it of the progress, trends and goals of events in the Arab world and the world.
 Introducing the Syrian Arab Republic and the Arab world globally.
 Upgrading the level of all kinds of arts.
 Encouraging talents in various fields of thought and creativity.
 Strengthening ties and relations between resident citizens and expatriate Arabs.
 Providing media and cultural services by encouraging scientific, literary, intellectual and artistic production, and encouraging production in the aforementioned fields.

Organisation
The Ministry of Information was created in the Syrian Arab Republic based on Legislative Decree No. 186 (1961) regarding the creation and updates of the Ministry of Information. 

The organizational structure consists of the following departments:

Central administration

Directorate of Minister’s Office 
Assistant Minister’s Office
Department of Administrative and Legal Affairs
Administrative Department
Occupational Affairs Division
Legal Department
Personnel Affairs Department
Leaves Division
Promotions Division
Legal Follow-up Department
Department of Legal Studies and Consultations
Department of Development Media
Department of Planning and International Cooperation
Department of Planning and Statistics
Planning and Follow-up Division
Statistics Division
Department of International Cooperation
Department of Qualification and Training
Directorate of Research and Studies
Directorate of Internal Oversight
Directorate of Financial Affairs
Directorate of Translation Office of Public Relations
Department of Jahness 
Administrative Directorate of Publications and Publishing Department of Periodicals 
License Department of Publications and Books 
Licensing Department 
Department of Publishing Houses, Printing Press and Libraries 
Administrative Office 
Central Post Office 
Damascus International Airport Office 
Directorate of Administrative Development 

Directorates in Governorates:

 Directorate of Information in Aleppo Governorate
 Directorate of Media in Homs Governorate 
 Directorate of Information in Hama Governorate 
 Directorate of Information in Latakia Governorate
 Directorate of Information in Tartous Governorate

Affiliates of the Ministry 

 Public Authority for Radio and Television
 General Organization for Television and Radio Production (ORTAS)
 Syrian Arab News Agency 
 Al Wahda Foundation for Press, Printing, Publishing and Distribution (includes Al-Thawra and Tishreen) 
 The Arab Advertising Foundation 
 Publications Distribution Company
 Technical Institute for Printing and Publishing, 
 Media Preparation Institute

List of Information Ministers

 Ahmed Iskandar Ahmed (1974-1984)
 Yassine Rajouh (1984-1987)
 Muhammad Salman (1987-2000)
 Adnan Omran (2000-2003)
 Ahmad Hassan (2003-2004)
 Mahdi Dakhlallah (2004-2006)
 Muhsen Bilal (2006-2011)
 Adnan Hassan Mahmoud (2011-2012)
 Omran al-Zoubi (2012-2016)
 Mohammad Ramez Tourjman (2016-2018)
 Imad Abullah Sarah (2018-2021)
Boutros Al-Hallaq (2021- present)

References

Syria
Information
Information